The Columbia Mall is a shopping mall located in Columbia, Missouri. It was built in 1985 and is the largest mall in its area. The mall's anchor stores are Target, JCPenney, Level Up Entertainment, two Dillard's stores, and Barnes & Noble.

Facility

The mall's anchors are two Dillard's stores, JCPenney, and Target. The mall also has a post office and a car wash. It was the 3rd mall in Columbia, after Parkade Plaza in 1965 and Biscayne Mall in 1972. In 2013, an H&M store was announced for the mall. In April 2018, Sears Holdings announced the closure of the mall's Sears store in July 2018, which is the company's last store in mid-Missouri. In August 2019, it was announced that a second Dillard's would move into the former Sears building. The store opened on February 22, 2020.

References

Further reading 

Shopping malls in Missouri
Buildings and structures in Columbia, Missouri
Brookfield Properties
Shopping malls established in 1985
Tourist attractions in Columbia, Missouri
1985 establishments in Missouri